Erik L'Homme, (born 22 December 1967 in Grenoble), is a French writer of youth novels. He is known for the fantasy trilogy Book of the Stars, the space opera trilogy Les Maîtres des brisants and the fantasy thriller series Phænomen. As of 2014, his works had sold a total of 1.1 million copies in France. The French-language edition of Book of the Stars has sold 650,000 copies and been translated into 28 languages, which have sold another million copies.

Works 
 Parlons khowar : langue et culture de l'ancien royaume de Chitral au Pakistan, Éditions L'Harmattan, 1999
 Book of the Stars (Le Livre des étoiles)
 Volume 1: Quadehar the Sorcerer (Qadehar le sorcier), Gallimard Jeunesse, Paris, 2001
 Volume 2: The Mystery of Lord Sha (Le Seigneur Sha), Gallimard Jeunesse, Paris, 2002
 Volume 3: The Face of the Shadow (Le Visage de l'Ombre), Gallimard Jeunesse, Paris, 2003
 Les Maîtres des brisants
 Volume 1: Chien-de-la-lune, Gallimard Jeunesse, Paris, 2004
 Volume 2: Le Secret des abîmes, 2005, Gallimard Jeunesse, Paris
 Volume 3: Seigneurs de guerre, Gallimard Jeunesse, Paris, 2009
 Tales of a Lost Kingdom (Contes d'un royaume perdu), 2005, Gallimard Jeunesse
 Phænomen
 Volume 1, 2006, Gallimard Jeunesse
 Volume 2, 2006, Gallimard Jeunesse
 Volume 3, 2006, Gallimard Jeunesse
 Cochon rouge, Gallimard Jeunesse, collection Folio Junior, 2009
 Des pas dans la neige, aventures au Pakistan, 2010, Gallimard Jeunesse
 A comme Association
 Les limites obscures de la magie, 2010, Gallimard Jeunesse and Rageot Éditeur
 La pâle lumière des ténèbres (with Pierre Bottero), 2010, Gallimard Jeunesse and Rageot Éditeur
 L'étoffe fragile du monde, 2011, Gallimard Jeunesse and Rageot Éditeur
 Le subtil parfum du soufre (with Pierre Bottero), 2011, Gallimard Jeunesse and Rageot Éditeur
 Là où les mots n'existent pas, 2011, Gallimard Jeunesse and Rageot Éditeur
 Ce qui dort dans la nuit, 2011, Gallimard Jeunesse and Rageot Éditeur
 Car nos cœurs sont hantés, 2012, Gallimard Jeunesse and Rageot Éditeur
 Le regard brûlant des étoiles, 2012, Gallimard Jeunesse and Rageot Éditeur
 Le regard des princes à minuit, 2014 Gallimard Jeunesse
 Terre-Dragon
 Volume 1: Le souffle des pierres, Série Romans Junior, Gallimard Jeunesse, 2014

References

1967 births
21st-century French novelists
French fantasy writers
French science fiction writers
Living people
French male novelists
21st-century French male writers